The 1917 Camp Devens football team was an American football team that represented the United States Army's 76th Infantry Division stationed at Camp Devens in Ayer, Massachusetts, during the 1917 fall football season.

The team had two players named to the 1917 All-Service football team: halfback Wayland Minot (Walter Camp, 1st team); and end C. A. Coolidge (Paul Purman, 1st team).

Schedule

References

Camp Devens
Camp Devens football